How the Quest Was Won is a TV series on ABC Network (Australia) that aired Friday 6.30PM in 2004–2005.
Hosted by Sam Longley, the series focused on sending three reporters (Jimmy Eaton, Brendan Hutchens, Sam Longley, Jane Cunningham) on a weekly challenge. The reporters commonly complete a quest to gain an insight into varying topics such as homelessness or life as a senior.

External links
 Official site

Australian Broadcasting Corporation original programming